22nd Army may refer to:

22nd Army (Soviet Union)
Twenty-Second Army (Japan)